Tysse may refer to:

Places
 Tysse, Vestland, the administrative centre of Samnanger municipality in Vestland county, Norway
 Tysse, or Tysso, a village in Osterøy municipality in Vestland county, Norway

People
 Erik Tysse (born 1980), a Norwegian race walker (brother of Kjersti Tysse Plätzer)
 Kjersti Tysse Plätzer (born 1972), a Norwegian race walker, who won the silver medal at the 2000 Summer Olympics in Sydney
 Hallvard Tysse, editor of the newspaper, Bygdanytt

See also 
 Tyssedal
 Toronto–York Spadina Subway Extension